Flames of the Falcon is an adventure module published in 1990 for the Advanced Dungeons & Dragons fantasy role-playing game.

Plot summary

Flames of the Falcon is the second sequel to Falcon's Revenge and direct sequel to Falconmaster. The scenario involves the player characters attempts to stop a vengeful cleric of the deity Iuz from terrorizing the city of Greyhawk. The module includes fold-up buildings.

Publication history

WGA3 Flames of the Falcon was written by Richard W. and Anne Brown, with a cover by Ken Frank, and was published by TSR in 1990 as a 64-page booklet with cardstock sheets and an outer folder.

This adventure is part of a series of three scenarios that starts with WGA1 Falcon's Revenge, continues with WGA2 Falconmaster, and concludes with WGA3 Flames of the Falcon.

Reception

Reviews

References

Greyhawk modules
Role-playing game supplements introduced in 1990